Shaykh Ahmad ibn Abi Talib Tabarsi known as Shaykh Tabarsi (Persian/Arabic: شيخ طبرسى), was a 12th-century Persian Shia scholar who died in 548 AH (1153 CE).

Life
Tabarsi was born in the year 1073 AD in Tabaristan province or some scholars said in Tafresh a city which was named at those days Tabres, Iran. He lived and taught in Mashhad until the year 1128 AD. He wrote a number of books on doctrine, theology, ethics and grammar.  He wrote his famous work, a commentary on the Quran, when he was over the age of sixty, living in Sabzawar.

He had many students, most famous are his son Radhi ad-Din Tabarsi, author of the book Makarim al-Akhlaq, and Ibn Shahr-e Ashub. He was killed in the Oghuz invasion to Khorasan. The location of his grave is disputed as to it being within the Imām Ridhā Shrine complex or whether it lies in Mazandaran. The shrine located in Mazandaran was the location of the battle between the forces of the Shah of Persia and the Bábís, followers of the Báb, over the period October 10, 1848 to May 10, 1849.

Work and contribution
Tabarsi had many works, but only around 20 of his books are survived to the present time. His main work is Majma‘ al-bayān (Compendium of Elucidations on the Exegesis of the Quran), a commentary (tafsir) of Qur'an. While Shia Scholars have written many commentaries of the Quran, none has been able to match the eloquence and magnitude of his book. He completed writing this book in the year 1139 AD. His other works are al-Kafi al-shall and Jawami al-Jami.

Notes

References

1073 births
1153 deaths
12th-century Iranian writers
People from Tafresh
People from Qaem Shahr
Burials in Mashhad
Burials at Imam Reza Shrine